The Pulp Mill Covered Bridge, also called the Paper Mill Covered Bridge, is a wooden covered bridge that crosses Otter Creek between Middlebury and Weybridge, Vermont on Seymour Street. It was listed on the National Register of Historic Places in 1974.

History
The bridge is of Burr arch design. Around 1860, the original Burr arches were removed, and laminated ones added to King post trusses, changing the bridge type to a King post with Burr arch design. This bridge has many distinctions. It is one of only seven double-barreled (two lane) covered bridges in the country, one of only two in the State of Vermont (the Museum Covered Bridge being the other), and the only still carrying regular traffic. It is also the oldest covered bridge in Vermont, and one of the oldest in the country.

The exact age of the bridge is in question. A sign on the bridge states it was built between 1808 and 1820. Covered Bridge expert Jan Lewandosky has placed the year of construction at approximately 1850 based on his search of Minutes of the Selectboard of the Town of Middlebury, and his voluminous knowledge of covered bridge construction. In 1850 the Town of Middlebury sent a person to Essex, Vermont, to examine a recently completed Burr Arch bridge, unfortunately the design was not copied correctly leading to the design flaws.

Improvements
The bridge was originally built as a single span but inherent design problems, and heavy use, has driven almost constant improvements. Amongst those improvements was the addition of two piers in the creek effectively dividing the bridge into 3 spans. A non-structural improvement was the addition of a walkway on the outside of the bridge by the Towns of Weybridge and Middlebury. Several other rounds of repairs have been made and chronicled extensively at the Vermont Bridges website.

The Pulp Mill bridge was closed from January 2, 2012 until November 9, 2012 for rehabilitation.

Photo gallery

See also
List of Vermont covered bridges
List of bridges documented by the Historic American Engineering Record in Vermont
List of bridges on the National Register of Historic Places in Vermont
National Register of Historic Places listings in Addison County, Vermont

References

External links

Buildings and structures in Middlebury, Vermont
Buildings and structures in Weybridge, Vermont
Bridges completed in 1820
Covered bridges on the National Register of Historic Places in Vermont
King post truss bridges in the United States
Wooden bridges in Vermont
Bridges in Addison County, Vermont
Tourist attractions in Addison County, Vermont
Historic American Engineering Record in Vermont
National Register of Historic Places in Addison County, Vermont
Road bridges on the National Register of Historic Places in Vermont
Burr Truss bridges in the United States
1820 establishments in Vermont